The 1997 ICF Canoe Slalom World Championships were held in Três Coroas, Brazil under the auspices of International Canoe Federation. It was the 25th edition. It was the first time the championships were held in South America.

Medal summary

Men's

Canoe

Kayak

Women's

Kayak

Medals table

References
Official results
International Canoe Federation

Icf Canoe Slalom World Championships, 1997
ICF Canoe Slalom World Championships
Canoe
Icf Canoe Slalom World Championships, 1997
Canoeing and kayaking competitions in Brazil